The Kochi Metro is a rapid transit system serving the city of Kochi in Kerala, India. It was opened to the public within four years of starting construction, making it one of the fastest completed metro projects in India. The Kochi metro project is the first metro in the country which connects rail, road and water transport facilities. In October 2017, Kochi Metro was named the Best Urban Mobility Project in India by the Urban Development Ministry, as part of the Urban Mobility India (UMI) international conference hosted by the ministry every year.

The construction work was started in June 2013 and a  section of the line from Aluva to Palarivattom was opened to passengers on 17 June 2017 by Narendra Modi, the Prime Minister of India. A second  section from Palarivattom to Maharaja's College metro station was inaugurated on 3 October 2017. Another  section from Maharaja's College Stadium to Thaikoodam was inaugurated on 3 September 2019 by Chief Minister Pinarayi Vijayan and Union Minister for Housing and Urban Affairs, Hardeep Singh Puri. Kochi metro also includes the technology for driverless trains and is hoping to implement this in the near future.

Kochi Metro was lauded for its decision to employ Kudumbashree workers and also members of the transgender community. It is the world's first rapid transit system whose entire management operations are handled by women. The system is also involved in sustainable initiatives with the introduction of non-motorized transport corridors in the city, installation of solar panels for power and vertical garden on every sixth metro pillar. Apart from the regular tickets, it has also adopted a single card, single timetable and a singular command and control. This debit card along with the Kochi One Mobile App will allow passengers to access all modes of public transportation as well as be utilized for mercantile and internet transactions and will introduce the 'click and collect' feature in the near future where goods ordered online can be collected in the metro stations. Every Kochi Metro station is designed on a specific theme around Kerala culture and geography.

Planning
The government led by E.K. Nayanar ideated the project in 1999. The cabinet meeting held on 21 July 1999, of the then Left Democratic Front (Kerala) government, assigned Rail India Technological and Economic Services (RITES) for the feasibility study for a metro rapid transport system in Kochi. The techno-economic feasibility study for a Metro Rapid Transit System in Kochi was completed in 1999, which was begun in the same year, by Rail India Technological and Economic Services (RITES). The techno-feasibility study report was submitted to the state government in 1999.

On 22 December 2004, the United Democratic Front Government led by Oommen Chandy assigned the Delhi Metro Rail Corporation (DMRC) the task of preparing the detailed project report (DPR) for the Kochi Metro rail project. It was expected to start by 2006 and complete by 2010. But the project was delayed because the Central Government expressed serious doubts about the economic viability of the project. In 2008 LDF Government under the Chief Minister V. S. Achuthanandan approved the Kochi Metro rail project in a cabinet meeting held on 2 January 2008 and sent to Central Government for ratification.

The Kerala government hoped the centre would approve a funding structure similar to that used for the Delhi Metro, but they were turned down. The Union Government supported using public-private partnership (PPP) on the build-operate-transfer model. The LDF state government wanted it to be in public sector, which was not acceptable to the Central Government. The victory of the United Democratic Front (UDF) in the 2011 Kerala legislative assembly elections, changed the scenario in the state and it was decided that the Kochi Metro would follow the Chennai Metro and Delhi Metro models, and would be implemented on a joint venture basis, with investments by the Central and State Government. A Cabinet decision was taken to form a special purpose vehicle (SPV) called Kochi Metro Rail Limited (KMRL) as per orders from Planning Commission and the Union Government for the implementation, operation and maintenance of the metro project.

The Public Investment Board (PIB) cleared the project on 22 March 2012 subject to final approval by the Union Cabinet. On 28 March 2012, at a KMRL board meeting, the decision was taken to entrust the Kochi Metro rail project work to the Delhi Metro Rail Corporation (DMRC). The number of metro stations on the line was set at 22. On 3 July 2012, Union Government gave final clearance to the project. Then Managing Director of KMRL, Tom Jose said, "Now we will sit down with our valued partner, DMRC, and chalk out the way forward, obtaining advice and guidance from former DMRC Chief, E Sreedharan. We aim to complete the project within a span of 3 to 4 years."

On 14 August 2012, the state government reconstituted the Board of Directors of KMRL. Power Secretary Elias George was appointed as the new Managing Director, replacing Tom Jose. It is believed that Jose's differences with Sreedharan led to the decision. The then Chief Minister Oommen Chandi stated that it was part of an administrative decision. The rest of the board would include the Chief Secretary, Finance Secretary and Principal Secretary (Water Resources).

The Director Board of Kochi Metro Rail Limited entrusted MD, KMRL to find alternate funding options for the project as advised by DEA (Department of Economic Affairs). As part of it, representatives of the French Development Agency (AFD) met the KMRL team as part of their pre-appraisal mission on 18–19 March 2013. The agency had detailed discussions with KMRL MD Elias George and other senior officials. They also visited the project alignment from Aluva to Pettah to understand the project better. Mme. Aude Flogny, Regional Director, South Asia & Mr. Gautier Kohler, Project Coordinator India were there in the team. Based on the inputs received from the pre-appraisal mission team of AFD, a formal detailed- appraisal mission team visited Kochi from 25 to 27 April 2013. The team included Senior Transport Expert of AFD, Mr. Xavier Hoang; AFD regional director for South Asia, Aude Flogny and Project Coordinator, Gautier Kohler. The team inspected the project site and held discussions relating to the funding for Kochi Metro Rail project. Kochi Metro Rail Limited is hoping to get a final commitment from the French financial agency AFD - Agence Française de Développement by the end of December 2013. AFD has stated that they could provide a loan of up to 130 million Euros which is around Rs. 10 billion.

On 4 April 2013, KMRL's Director Board signed a contract with the DMRC. The 22 proposed stations for the Kochi Metro were approved by the State Cabinet on 19 June 2013.

Controversy over DMRC's role
In December 2011, Kerala Minister for Public Works V.K. Ebrahim Kunju announced that the work would be offered by global tender. DMRC MD E. Sreedharan said he would not be interested in participating unless the DMRC was involved. Citing the examples of metros in Bangalore and Chennai, he said, "They decided to take up the work on their own but had to depend on the DMRC for many things. I did not want Kochi to make the same mistake."

On 3 January 2012, Oommen Chandi stated that E. Sreedharan would have final say on the metro project.

Aryadan Mohammed, Minister for Power and Transport and the Vice Chairman of Existing Board of Directors, said that the Kerala Government had decided as early as in March 2010 that Sreedharan would be in charge of the project. "There are no doubts about this. It was the Kerala Cabinet which had taken this decision and there would be no change in it," he said.

Some government ministers and IAS officials alleged that Central Vigilance Commission (CVC) norms do not allow awarding of a contract to an agency which did the consultancy for a project. However, DMRC principal adviser E. Sreedharan has stated that the CVC norms would not apply in this case, as the contract is between two government agencies. Another issue for the metro was that DMRC had to obtain the permission of its director's board to undertake projects outside Delhi.

On 8 January 2013, following a high-level meeting attended by Oommen Chandy (then Chief Minister), Minister of Overseas Indian Affairs Vayalar Ravi, Union Minister K.V. Thomas, DMRC Principal Advisor E. Sreedharan, Union Urban Development Secretary Sudheer Krishna, Chief Secretary Jose Syriac, KMRL MD Elias George, DMRC MD Mangu Singh, Union Minister for Urban Development Kamal Nath officially confirmed that DMRC would undertake the work of Kochi Metro.

Support for DMRC
The Corporation of Cochin and Kochi Mayor Tony Chammany supported handing over work to DMRC..Chammany had stated that "Government of Kerala and the Corporation of Cochin along with the people of Kerala unanimously want the Delhi Metro Rail Corporation to take up the work of Kochi metro which will be crucial to the growth and development of Cochin City." Opposition parties in the state, on several occasions, expressed support for the DMRC and alleged that corruption and delays would occur in the project if it was not handed to DMRC. JICA asked the KMRL to ensure the support of DMRC on 1 December 2012. Takeshi Fukayama of JICA said, "DMRC has an expertise in implementing the project and so, KMRL should take their support in executing the project. KMRL should use the expertise of DMRC for implementing the project."

Political support
The first phase of the Kochi Metro took over two decades, from ideation to creation. During this period, governments changed at the national level between Congress- and BJP-led coalitions. The project got lagged in the period 2007–2010. Three chief ministers were instrumental in promoting the Kochi Metro; namely, A. K. Antony, V. S. Achuthanandan, and Oommen Chandy. It was inaugurated in June 2017 . The metro was built by E. Sreedharan, 'Metro Man' Technocrat who earlier created Delhi Metro and Konkan Railway.

Preparatory work and supporting activities 
The DMRC felt that it was necessary to undertake preparatory works to avoid disruptions to commuters during the construction of the Kochi Metro. The agency suggested five preparatory works to the State government, which approved all five projects in March 2010. The preparatory works were intended to be completed before constructing the metro. The works included the widening of 3 arterial roads and the construction of a new rail over bridge (RoB) near KSRTC station and a foot over bridge. 
The A.L. Jacob RoB near the KSRTC stand, commissioned on 12 May 2013, was the first of the five works to be completed. Apart from the five originally proposed projects, some additional projects such as the construction of the Ernakulam North RoB, and the flyover at Edapally were also carried out.

The work was being undertaken by DMRC initially but was later undertaken by KMRL, due to a shortage of qualified personnel with the DMRC. Other projects include construction of a new RoB connecting Mullassery Canal Road and Salim Rajan Road, and the widening of the Town Hall-Madhava Pharmacy Junction stretch, and Jos Junction-South Railway Station road. The DMRC will execute all preparatory works. The State Government had set apart 1.58 billion for preliminary works. On 3 March 2012, KMRL handed over 150 million to DMRC for undertaking the preparatory works. The DMRC had been given 230 million earlier.

Flyover at Edappally
KMRL and the Kerala Public Works Department (PWD) signed an agreement on 22 July 2013, to build a  flyover at Edapally to reduce the congestion at the junction of NH 47 and NH 17 at Edappally. The DMRC was appointed to implement the project.

Education minister C Raveendranath inaugurated the 433-meter long flyover on 11 September 2016. It is supported by Twenty-four piers with 90 piles. Kadakampally Surendran who is the current Minister for Devaswom, Tourism and Co-Operation declared that the inauguration of Kochi Metro Train service is expected to occur on 30 May 2017

Pachalam railway over bridge
On 21 February 2014, the Kerala High Court expressed its displeasure over the failure of the Kochi Corporation to finalise the final alignment of the proposed rail over bridge (ROB) at Pachalam submitted by the Roads and Bridges Development Corporation. The Division Bench comprising Chief Justice Manjula Chellur and Justice A.M. Shafeeque directed the corporation to place on record the final alignment of the ROB by 2 April 2014. The Bench observed that the civic body had "not moved an inch", after the discussion on the alignment submitted by the Roads and Bridges Development Corporation in 2011.

The Pachalam RoB was approved in-principle by the Kochi Corporation on 10 February 2014. The RoB received approval from the State Cabinet on 26 February. The 2-lane, 10-metre wide RoB is estimated to cost  and will be constructed by the DMRC. About 52 cents of land will be acquired for the project.

The foundation stone for the project was laid on 4 March, and construction was expected to complete in 6 months. It was inaugurated on 11 January 2016. Cherian Varkey Construction Company was the contractor for the project.

Shifting Vyttila station

Based on suggestions from Centre for Public Policy Research (CPPR), Kochi, Kochi Metro Rail Limited decided to shift Vyttila station to Vyttila Mobility Hub to follow the guidelines of the Ministry of Urban Development so that the station could also provide bus and water transport. Long-distance buses operate out of Vyttila hub and the hub authorities are planning to build a new boat jetty there as the part of their second phase of development. Thus, the Kochi metro project became the first metro in the country which connects rail, road and water transport facilities.

Land acquisition
The total amount of land required for the project is 40.409 hectares. The total land required for all stations is 9.3941 hectares, including area required for parking lots. Aluva, Pettah, Kalamassery, Edappally and Kaloor stations will have larger parking areas requiring about 2.7869 hectares of land. The coach depot at Muttom requires 23.605 hectares of land, higher than the originally estimated 17 hectares. Approximately, 4.6 hectares of land will be required for widening curves and stretches where the metro's viaduct is positioned outside the median. Apart from the above, 102.50 cents of land is required for preparatory works, and 94 hectares in Muttom and 20 hectares of land in Kakkanad is to be acquired for developing the land for commercial use .

The original plan was to acquire about 31.9217 hectares of land in Ernakulam, Elamkulam, Poonithura, Thrikkakara North, Edappally South and Aluva West. Out of this approximately, 17 hectares was for the Muttom coach maintenance depot. The remaining land was required for the construction of metro stations. Approximately, 15 hectares out of the required 31.92 was government-owned land. However, the land required for parking at stations, road widening and straightening curves along the alignment was not assessed in the original plan. The addition of parking lots increased the amount of land required by 8.4874 hectares.

The district-level purchase committee fixed the maximum compensation for land acquisition at  5.2 million percent for the land to be acquired for preparatory works. The district administration can take ownership of land only after paying at least 80% of the price. Land acquisition for a foot overbridge near the KSRTC main depot will cost  2.8 million percent and land for the approach road of the Ponnurunni railway overbridge will be acquired at  1850,000 percent. The prices have been approved by the State Empowered Committee. The total estimated cost of land acquisition is  11.10 billion., higher than the  6.72 billion estimated as per the original plan.

The Kadavanthra station was built on the land which housed GCDA's Nandanam park near the canal. Part of the land required was obtained from the Greater Cochin Development Authority on 13 February 2014. The remaining land was owned by the KSEB and was acquired separately.

When the Railways demanded  3 billion for a 35-year lease of 4,360 square metres of land intended as the location of Ernakulam South metro station and other facilities, KMRL officials rejected the offer, as  3 billion worked out to about 8% of the metro project's total cost. The station was instead built on land owned by the Kochi Corporation near Ernakulam Girls' High School, while the Operations Control Centre was built in Muttom. The cost for the station was  100 million.

Construction
Former Prime Minister Manmohan Singh laid the foundation stone for the project on 13 September 2012. Construction work on the Kochi Metro rail project began on 7 June 2013, with the piling works for the viaducts near Changampuzha Park, after an official launch ceremony held at the Jawaharlal Nehru Stadium at 10:30 am on the same day. At the inauguration ceremony, the State Government announced that the metro would be extended a kilometre-and-a-half from Pettah to Tripunithura, Construction work on Metro' first station, at Kaloor, began at 10:30 am IST on 30 September 2013, when Soma Constructions began piling. The next station where piling work was carried out was Aluva.

Several companies (Era Infra Engineering, Larsen & Toubro, Cherian Varkey Construction Company-RDS, SP Singla Constructions and Soma Constructions) were contracted to build viaducts and stations. Cherian Varkey Constructions-RDS(CVCC-RDS JV) were awarded the work for the demolition of the existing ROB and rebuilding of the north over bridge  into a 4 lane road with metro viaducts.

About 4.5 to 500,000 cubic meters of sand was required for construction of the metro. KMRL has set up a vertical garden on every sixth pillar along the metro rail system.

The first 'U' shaped concrete girder of the Kochi Metro Rail was successfully installed on Saturday, 12 July 2014 early morning. The girder was installed at Pulinchode near Aluva. The ‘U- shaped’ girder was cast at the Metro Casting Yard at Kalamassery. It was transported from the yard around 7 pm on Friday with the help of two huge cranes and special trailers brought from Mumbai.

The girder reached the site at midnight and was installed with the help of cranes having capacities of 350 tonnes and 400 tonnes.

The first trial run was flagged off by Chief Minister Oommen Chandy, on 23 January 2016. The three-car train set successfully completed the trial run.

On 8 May 2017, Kochi Metro was given the final approval to start service.

In July 2017, a consortium of Cherian Varkey Construction Company (CVCC) and Vijay Nirman Constructions (VNC) has been awarded the contract to execute the construction of Kochi Metro works from Maharaja's College to Ernakulam south, and also from Kunnara Park to Pettah.

Tripunithura extension
KMRL approved the extension of the metro to Tripunithura on 27 January 2014. Speaking to the media after the meeting, Union Urban Development Secretary and KMRL chairman Sudhir Krishna announced that the  extension would cost an additional . The extension will add two more stations, near Vadakkekotta and SN Junction, to the line. The extension will be completed after the Aluva-Pettah stretch. The State Cabinet approved the Tripunithura extension on 5 March 2014, based on the preliminary RITES report.

Phase II: Kakkanad Infopark extension
In November 2016, KMRL began the land acquisition process for an extension of the metro up to Infopark. KMRL will widen the Kakkanad-Airport corridor to a 22-metre-wide stretch, and construct metro pillars in the centre of the stretch. Palarivattom Junction, Palarivattom Bypass Junction and Collectorate Junction will also be widened. The  extension will link Jawaharlal Nehru International Stadium to Infopark via Kakkanad, and is estimated to cost . Ernakulam District Collector K. Mohammed Y. Safirulla stated in March 2017, that the land evaluation process for the project had been completed.

The State Cabinet approved Phase II of the Kochi Metro on 17 May 2017. It is estimated to cost . Unlike Phase I, the KMRL will implement Phase II independently without the involvement of the DMRC. Phase II comprises a  line from Jawaharlal Nehru International Stadium to Infopark via Kakkanad. There will be 11 stations on the line - Palarivattom Junction, Palarivattom Signal, Chembumukku, Vazhakkala, Kunnumpuram, Kakkanad Junction, Kochi Special Economic Zone, Chittethukara, Rajagiri, InfoPark I and InfoPark II.

Phase III: Airport extension
The third phase of the metro includes plans to extend the line from Aluva up to the Cochin International Airport at Nedumbassery. Airport authorities had requested that the State Government build the metro link in the second phase, but the government decided to take it up in the third phase instead.

Finances

Funding and Revenue

KMRL also signed an agreement with French financial aid agency Agence Française de Développement (AFD) on 8 February 2014, to provide a  loan for the project. The AFD loan is for a period of 25 years at the rate of 2% interest. The period is composed of a 20-year repayment period and a five-year grace period. The total debt component from Canara Bank and AFD amounted to INR 21.70 billion. The centre and state governments contributed  each as equity share for the project. The line is expected to break even in 2023.

KMRL signed a term loan agreement for Rs 1,170 crore with Canara Bank on 20 July 2014. The Metro authority said that Canara Bank has taken this project as a special case with their request of interest reduction and provided relaxations on their conditions.

In November 2016, the AFD agreed to provide a loan of EUR 175 million to the KMRL for the  extension of the metro from JLN Stadium to Infopark via Kakkanad. Although the AFD typically issues 20-year loans for urban infrastructure projects, it agreed to offer KMRL a longer tenure of 25 years at an interest rate of 1.35%. EUR 22 million will be utilized to carry out works related to non-motorised transportation at 20 stations, pedestrianization of MG Road, and junction development at Aluva, Edappally and Vyttila. The extension is estimated to cost .

Revenues 
Apart from ticket sales, the KMRL intends to generate revenue through advertising and leasing out station names. Advertisements will be placed at metro stations, pillars along the viaduct, the interior/exterior of trains and the KMRL website. Stations may be renamed after sponsors who pay a fee. The metro will also create links between metro stations and nearby commercial establishments if the establishments pay a fee. Kochi Metro has also encouraged bidding for the naming rights of selected stations. The station near Lissie Hospital is named after the hospital after they won the naming rights for the station. The station was renamed to Town Hall Metro Station on 1 February 2020. Similarly, OPPO bagged the naming rights for Edapally and MG Road stations. Hence, the stations are named Edapally OPPO and MG Road OPPO respectively.

The Indian Institute of Management, Bengaluru (IIMB) estimated that Kochi Metro could break even within 8 years of operation, assuming that the estimated ridership in the DPR is achieved.

Stations
KMRL has proposed an elevated route spanning  from Aluva to Pettah with 23 stations.

Design

Egis India was responsible for the design of the stations such as floors and doors, and the Indian Institute of Architecture (Kochi Chapter) developed the designs of the roof and the interior of the stations. The IIA presented the designs of 14 stations to the KMRL on 14–15 March 2014.

The interiors and exteriors of the Kochi Metro stations are decorated with references to local culture. However, the traditional nālukettu architectural style was not structurally feasible. According to a KMRL official, "It [stations] will be designed in such a way that it reflects the Kerala style of architecture with each of the 22 stations reflecting a regional theme. ... the stations will reflect an independent adaptation of the state's culture to give it a distinct look". KMRL officials stated, "Our effort is to highlight the uniqueness of the state, especially to outsiders, but the station buildings won't be an exact replica of the Kerala model of architecture. The station designs are contemporary but inspired by socio-cultural themes. The kettuvalam or houseboat, for example, widely used in the backwaters of the state, is the theme of one of the stations, bearing descriptions of how it is made with a model exhibited alongside."

The Western Ghats that run along most of the Kerala-Tamil Nadu border forms a common design theme at all the stations. The design of each individual station is a variation on this common theme. Aluva station's theme is Kerala's natural beauty and the station's interiors depict the Periyar and the other major rivers in the state. The walls of the Pulinchodu station feature flora and fauna of the Western Ghats. Kalamassery station depicts rare species of the mountain range. The theme of CUSAT station is the state's maritime history, and that of Pathadipalam station is the fish of the Western Ghats. Spices of Kerala is the theme of the Edapally station, while the cultural and artistic heritage of Kerala forms the theme of the Changampuzha Park station. Palarivattom station features images of the flowers of the Western Ghats. The Jawaharlal Nehru Stadium station will depict the heritage of sports in the state. The monsoon season forms the theme of the Kaloor station. Endangered species and animals of Western Ghats are depicted in MG Road station, and the history and trade routes of Kochi are the theme of the Maharaja's College station.

Stations were designed to provide the maximum natural ventilation in passenger areas. All stations utilize LED lighting and have water efficient fittings in toilets. Some stations also provide facilities for rainwater harvesting. A three-second tune composed by Bijibal will be played whenever train doors open or close at stations. The tune features traditional sounds of Kerala music featuring a chenda and ilathalam. KMRL chose to play the tune instead of the typical chime played on other metros in the country in order to give "Malayali flavour" to the metro system.

List

Infrastructure

Rolling stock

The Kochi Metro uses 65-metre long Metropolis train sets built and designed by Alstom. Each coach will have three wide doors, with automatic door closing and opening. A total of 22 trains will be inducted for the first phase of operations of the metro. The capacity of each train is 975 passengers.

It was initially proposed to use maglev trains from South Korea for Kochi Metro. It was later decided that Kochi Metro will run on standard gauge, with 3 coaches initially in each train, which can be extended to six coaches in future.

The DMRC floated an initial global tender in July 2013 for the manufacture and design of the coaches. Hyundai Rotem/BEML and Band Changchun Railway Vehicle Co Ltd were the only bidders when the bids were opened in December 2013. The Chinese firm did not qualify, leaving only the HYUNDAI consortium in contention. The  contract was re-tendered on 10 March 2014, and the coach width requirement was changed. The DMRC opposed re-tendering, stating that it might delay the metro's opening, by up to a year or more. It also argued that coaches supplied by Hyundai Rotem were already in use on the Delhi Metro, as well as a few other metros. According to Metro officials, "The delay will impact integrated trial of coaches in Aluva-Palarivattom route, initially scheduled for August 2015. With re-tendering process on, the proposed integration of coaches with tracks, third traction (sourcing power from the third rail) and signal systems can be done only by 2015-end or early 2016." The DMRC held a pre-bid meeting in New Delhi on 2 April 2014 to allow interested firms to seek clarifications regarding technical specifications for the contract for the coaches.

The re-tendering process was won by French company Alstom. The contract is for design, manufacturing, supply, installation, testing and commissioning of 25 standard track gauge trains with an option to supply 25 additional metro sets.

Signaling
The Kochi Metro is the first metro system in India to use a communication-based train control (CBTC) system for signalling and telecommunication. In addition to train sets, the signalling contract was also won by Alstom and will use Alstom Urbalis 400 CBTC signalling. In a CBTC system, the importance of signals is limited as "beacons" located along the corridor relay the precise position of trains to the operation control centre (OCC) at Muttom. The computerised OCC monitors and controls all train movements. CBTC also enables the use of driverless trains, although the Kochi Metro will initially use metro pilots during its operations.

Power
KMRL will acquire 20 MW of electricity, to operate the metro. The electricity will be supplied from the Kaloor substation of the Kerala State Electricity Board (KSEB). The DMRC was in favour of supplying power through 25 kV overhead power lines. This was opposed by the KMRL who preferred to source power from the third rail laid alongside the metro track. It was decided to supply power via the 750 V DC third rail. In January 2015, Alstom won the contract for manufacturing, supply, installation, testing and commissioning of the 750 V third-rail traction electrification and auxiliary substations (ASS) and associated SCADA systems. Under this contract, Alstom is also in charge of the supply, installation, testing and commissioning of 110 kV cabling incoming from the grid (incl. civil works), 2x GIS3; 110 kV Intake Power Substations and their associated Power Transformers 110 kV/33 kV, and 33 kV/415 V Auxiliary Transformers.

In November 2016, KMRL began installing solar panels on the rooftops of 22 stations and the buildings at the Muttom yard. The project was contracted to Hero Solar Energy (P) Ltd. The contract is based on the Renewable Energy Service Company (RESCO) model, under which Hero will invest the entire  to install the panels and operate the solar power station for a period of 25 years. In March 2017, KMRL unveiled a plan to install solar panels on 9 acres of land available at the Muttom yard. The Kochi Metro owns a 52.3-acre plot in Muttom, of which 31.1 acres is required for the metro depot. Installation of a 2.3 MW solar plant at the Muttom depot was completed in May 2017.

Parking
KMRL assigned Cochin University of Science and Technology (CUSAT) to conduct a feasibility study on incorporating parking spaces on the metro rail corridor. The study was focused on understanding the ridership of all 22 stations including two terminal stations and assessing the possible number of two and four-wheelers, which would require parking in the Aluva- Pettah Metro Rail corridor. As part of the study, the School of Management Studies (SMS) also prepared the layout for parking with traffic circulation plan for each station. The SMS submitted the report on 10 August 2012. A preliminary report was submitted in June 2012. CUSAT was given the task, as the report submitted by DMRC did not have specifications regarding the parking facilities.
The DMRC's DPR mentioned parking lots only at the 2 terminal stations - Aluva and Pettah. CUSAT's detailed study was submitted on 10 August 2012. The study proposed parking lots adjacent to all stations with some having multi-level parking. In some stations, parking facilities connected to the station via walkways will be located away from the station due to lack of available land. KMRL will consider introducing shuttle services between parking lots and stations if the distance is long. SMS will work out the requirement of land that has to be acquired for this. KMRL says parking facilities will prevent traffic congestion and integrate personal transport system with mass rapid transit systems.

Skywalks

KMRL has built skywalks connecting metro stations & nearby landmarks. At present there are two skywalks; one connecting Edapally station and LuLu Mall and the other connecting MG Road station and Chennai Silks. KMRL are also planning to build skywalks connecting Ernakulam South station to Ernakulam Junction railway station and Vytilla Station to Vyttila Mobility Hub, once Phase 1 is completed.

Free Wifi
Kochi Metro Rail Limited (KMRL) Managing Director Lokanath Behera inaugurated a free Wi-Fi service for its commuters on 11th October 2022. Commuters can now browse any website of their choice during travel from Aluva to SN junction, and in the return direction, said KMRL. Currently, 4G network is being used to provide the Wi-Fi service inside the train and it will be upgraded to 5G network once the service is widely available. Keeping the user data privacy in mind, KMRL has taken special care to not share user credentials with any outside agency as per the statutory guidelines. The initiative is being implemented to promote the Digital India Campaign, in association with Worldshore, a company based in Thiruvananthapuram.

Operations

Open Data
In 16, March 2018 KMRL has launched Kochi Open Data as their part of their Open Data Initiative. By this Kochi Metro become the first metro agency in the country to adopt an open-data approach to improve access to its services in the Kochi city. The information on scheduled stops, routes and fares have been converted into the universally accepted General Transit Feed Specification (GTFS) and has been allowed to developers, entrepreneurs, data analysts to   download from the KMRL website.

Fare collection

The metro line is split into 6 fare zones named F1, F2, F3, F4, F5 and F6, corresponding to a distance that is a multiple of five. The minimum fare of 10 applies for the first 2 km, with rates increasing by 10 for subsequent fare zone. Metro fares are slightly higher than the fare for Volvo city bus services in Kochi.

The metro system will use the Kochi One pre-paid EMV chip smart card, which can also be used on other modes of public transport in the city, including KSRTC and private buses, ferries operated by the SWTD, and the proposed air-conditioned ferries to be operated by the KMRL.

Frequency

The metro operates with a headway of 7 minutes. Train service starts at 6:00 a.m. and continues till 10:00 p.m. from Monday to Saturday. On Sundays, the service starts at 8:00 a.m. and ends at 10:00 p.m.

Management

KMRL signed an agreement with Kudumbashree, a women's self-help group, on 11 December 2016 to manage the metro station premises including ticketing, customer relations, housekeeping, parking management and running the canteens. KMRL stated that it would also hire transgender employees along with Kudumbashree.

Boat service
A boat service from Vyttila to Kakkanad, operated by the Kerala State Water Transport Department (KSWTD) was launched on 19 November 2013. It is integrated with the metro and was used for diverting traffic during construction of the metro. The boats were manufactured by Steel Industries Kerala Ltd, Kannur (part of Steel Authority of India Ltd). The boats complete the  Vyttila-Kakkanad journey in approximately 25 minutes.

In February 2017, the Kerala Government announced a plan for Kochi Water Metro service spanning 16 routes in Kochi. The service is expected to be completely operational by FY19.

Criticism
In January 2012, in response to the Kerala government's decision to have the Kochi Metro project go through a global tender, Kodiyeri Balakrishnan, of the opposition party the Communist Party of India (Marxist) (CPI(M)), accused Chief Minister Oommen Chandy of trying to oust the Delhi Metro Rail Corporation (DMRC).

In early 2014, E. Sreedharan criticised Kochi Metro Railway Limited (KMRL) for its involvement in the re-tender for the procurement of coaches for the project, saying that this would result in a delay of six or seven months. Arayadan Muhammed, Minister for Power and Transport of Kerala, responded that KMRL called for the tender for the sake of transparency. In the earlier tender that the DMRC had floated, the sole bidder was Hyundai. The second tender was won by Alstom, which placed a lower bid.

See also
 Transport in Kochi
 Kochi Water Metro
 Rapid transit in India

References

External links

 Mathrubhumi Kochi metro Train Review Video metro station How To Video
 Official website
 Official Facebook Page
 Mathrubhumi KMRL Mymetro Special Edition
 Kochi Metro Timings

 
Standard gauge railways in India
History of Kerala (1947–present)